József Darvas (born József Dumitrás; 10 February 1912 – 3 December 1973) was a Hungarian writer and politician, who served as Minister of Religion and Education between 1950 and 1951, as Minister of Education between 1951 and 1953 and as Minister of Culture between 1953 and 1956. He was member of the Presidential Council of the People's Republic of Hungary since 1971.

References
 Magyar Életrajzi Lexikon

1912 births
1973 deaths
People from Orosháza
People from the Kingdom of Hungary
Hungarian Lutherans
National Peasant Party (Hungary) politicians
Members of the Hungarian Socialist Workers' Party
Education ministers of Hungary
Culture ministers of Hungary
Members of the National Assembly of Hungary (1945–1947)
Members of the National Assembly of Hungary (1947–1949)
Members of the National Assembly of Hungary (1949–1953)
Members of the National Assembly of Hungary (1953–1958)
Members of the National Assembly of Hungary (1958–1963)
Members of the National Assembly of Hungary (1963–1967)
Members of the National Assembly of Hungary (1967–1971)
Members of the National Assembly of Hungary (1971–1975)
20th-century Lutherans